Lancellotti is an Italian surname. Notable people with the surname include:

Giovan Paolo Lancellotti (1522–1590), Italian jurist
Rick Lancellotti (born 1956), American baseball player

See also
Villa Lancellotti, a villa in Frascati, Italy

Italian-language surnames